"Gli ostacoli del cuore" (en: The Obstacles of Heart) is a pop single by  Italian singer Elisa, featuring pop rock Italian singer Ligabue, from her first greatest hits album, Soundtrack '96-'06. Released as the album's lead single, the song was written by Ligabue, and produced by Corrado Rustici.

The song also appears on the album Caterpillar, released in September 2007. In the Caterpillar's version, the song is sung without Ligabue.

Single's popularity
"Gli ostacoli del cuore", remained on the Italian digital download top-ten for about a month, and was a #1 album on the Italian chart.

Music video
The "Gli ostacoli del cuore" music video was directed by Ligabue.

Certifications

References

2006 singles
Elisa (Italian singer) songs
2006 songs
Sugar Music singles